2014 Kawasaki Frontale season.

J1 League

References

External links
 J.League official site

Kawasaki Frontale
Kawasaki Frontale seasons